WJTG is a Christian radio station affiliate of Family Life Radio, licensed to Fort Valley, Georgia, broadcasting on 91.3 FM, and serving the Macon–Warner Robins area. The station's format consists of Christian contemporary music and Christian talk and teaching.

External links
 Family Life Radio's website
 

Family Life Radio stations
JTG